Puerto Rico Highway 161 (PR-161)  is an east–west bypass located north of downtown Santa Isabel, Puerto Rico. This road serves as an alternate route to the PR-1 and is known as Desvío Norte Luis Muñoz Marín.

Major intersections

See also

 List of highways numbered 161

References

External links
 

161
Santa Isabel, Puerto Rico